Beach volleyball competitions at the 2015 Pan American Games in Toronto were held from July 13 to 21 at a temporary facility in Exhibition Place called the Chevrolet Beach Volleyball Centre. A total of two beach volleyball tournaments were held: one each for the men and women.

Competition schedule

The following is the competition schedule for the beach volleyball competitions:

Medal table

Medalists

Qualification

A total of sixteen teams per gender qualified to compete at the games. The host nation (Canada) qualified in each event automatically, along with the top five ranked nations in South America and the top ten nations ranked in North, Central America and the Caribbean. The rankings on January 1, 2015 were used to determine the teams.

Participating nations
A total of 19 nations qualified athletes. The numbers in parenthesis represents the number of participants entered.

See also
Volleyball at the 2016 Summer Olympics

References

 
Events at the 2015 Pan American Games
2015
2015 in beach volleyball